"Working My Way Back to You" is a song made popular by The Four Seasons in 1966 and The Spinners in 1980.

Written by Sandy Linzer and Denny Randell, the song was originally recorded by The Four Seasons in 1966, reaching No. 9 on the U.S. Billboard Hot 100. In the UK Top 50 chart it spent three weeks – all at No. 50. It is the only hit to feature the group's arranger Charles Calello in the temporary role of bassist/bass vocalist, having replaced original member Nick Massi.

The lyrics tell about a man who cheated on his girlfriend. When she leaves, he realizes that he did love her and is very remorseful about his past actions. He vows to win her love back. It is in some ways a re-casting of the melody from their previous hit, "Let's Hang On!".

Cash Box described it as a "raunchy, blues-drenched ode about a love-sick fella who hopes to be re-united with his ex-gal," and said that it has "money-in-the-bank-sound."

Charts

The Spinners version

In 1979 American soul and R&B group The Spinners recorded a medley of "Working My Way Back to You" and Michael Zager's "Forgive Me Girl," staying at No. 1 in the UK Singles Chart for two weeks in April 1980. On the Billboard Hot 100 singles chart, the medley (released in December 1979 in the U.S.) peaked at the No. 2 position in March and April 1980 for two weeks, behind "Another Brick in the Wall" by Pink Floyd. The Spinners version also made it to No. 6 on the Soul Singles chart and No. 8 on the disco/dance chart. The version of the Spinners was taken up in French by the French Canadian singer Jean Nichol under the title "Je voudrais te retrouver" (I want to find you).

Chart performance

Weekly charts

Year-end charts

Boyzone version

The Irish boyband Boyzone released a cover version of "Working My Way Back to You" as their debut single in May 1994. The song reached No. 3 on the Irish Singles Chart. It is one of their only singles to feature Mikey Graham on lead vocals.

The band later recorded a French version in collaboration with Alliage. This French version of the track is credited as being a major turning point in the career of producer-songwriter Steve Mac. A lack of interest from the "usual producers" led to Polydor phoning up Mac and asking him to take on the role, and by doing he effectively made a decisive progression from his early dance-pop singles to the mature balladry he has since made a very successful career out of.

Track listing
 Working My Way Back To You
"Working My Way Back To You" – 4:12
"Working My Way Back To You" (POD 12" Mix) – 8:13
"Father And Son" – 2:49

 Te Garder Pres De Moi
"Te Garder Près De Moi" (Featuring Alliage) – 4:41
"Te Garder Près De Moi" (Instrumental) – 4:41

Charts

 Working My Way Back to You

 Te Garder Près De Moi (with Alliage)

Personnel

The Four Seasons' version
Lead vocals by Frankie Valli
Background vocals by Tommy DeVito, Charles Calello and Bob Gaudio
Instrumentation by Charles Calello (bass), Bob Gaudio (keyboards), Tommy DeVito (guitar)

The (Detroit) Spinners' version
Lead vocals by Jonathan Edwards and Pervis Jackson
Background vocals by Bobby Smith, Pervis Jackson, Henry Fambrough and Billy Henderson
Instrumentation by various Philadelphia area musicians

Boyzone version
Lead vocals by Stephen Gately and Mikey Graham
Background vocals by Keith Duffy, Mikey Graham, Shane Lynch and Ronan Keating

References

1966 singles
1979 singles
1980 singles
1994 debut singles
The Four Seasons (band) songs
The Spinners (American group) songs
Boyzone songs
Irish Singles Chart number-one singles
UK Singles Chart number-one singles
Songs written by Sandy Linzer
Songs written by Denny Randell
Song recordings produced by Bob Crewe
Philips Records singles
Atlantic Records singles
PolyGram singles
1966 songs